Cuba competed at the 2019 World Aquatics Championships in Gwangju, South Korea from 12 to 28 July.

Artistic swimming

Cuba's artistic swimming team consisted of 4 athletes (4 female).

Women

 Legend: (R) = Reserve Athlete

Diving

Cuba entered six divers.

Men

Women

Mixed

Swimming

Cuba entered three swimmers.

Men

Women

Water polo

Women's tournament

Team roster

Mairelis Zunzunegui Morgan (C)
Dalia Grau Quintero
Madonni Chavez Pena
Thaimi Gonzalez Tamayo
Daniuska Carrasco Leyva
Mayelin Bernal Villa
Jennifer Plasencia Suarez
Arisel Gonzalez Sanchez
Cecilia Diaz Mesa
Dianela Fria Tellez
Lisbeth Santana Sosa
Aliannis Ramirez White
Arisney Ramos Betancourt

Group C

13th–16th place semifinals

15th place match

13th–16th place semifinals

15th place game

References

World Aquatics Championships
2019
Nations at the 2019 World Aquatics Championships